A Tehsil Municipal Administration (TMA) is an organization associated with each Tehsil of Pakistan. TMAs are responsible for spatial planning and municipal services, and work closely with union councils.

Responsibilities

Key functions of a TMA include:
Monitoring and supervising the performances of government offices and reporting to the district government
Spatial planning
Executing and managing development plans
Controlling land development
Enforcing laws, rules, and bye-laws
Maintaining databases and information systems
Collecting taxes, fines, and penalties
Organizing recreational events
Coordinating between village and neighborhood councils
Regulating markets
Developing and managing schemes in collaboration with the district government
Creating strategies for developing infrastructure, improving service delivery, and implementing laws
Preparing and presenting reports on tehsil administration performance
Calling for reports from tehsil-based offices of government

By region

TMAs in Khyber Pakhtunkhwa must be carried out in accordance with the Khyber Pakhtunkhwa Local Government Act 2013.

See also
Tehsildar

References

Local government in Pakistan
Tehsils of Pakistan
Forms of local government